This is a list of television programs broadcast by FX in Italy.

Programming

 80° Minuto
 The A-Team
 Barbershop: The Series
 Barzecole
 Battlestar Galactica
 Baywatch
 Beach Patrol
 The Benny Hill Show
 Blade: The Series
 Burn Notice
 Carpoolers
 CHiPs
 Ciak Si Giri
 COPS
 The Dead Zone
 The Dresden Files
 The Dukes of Hazzard
 Eureka
 Fans United
 Fantasies
 Fermata d'Autobus
 Foursome (Season 2)
 Hotel Erotica
 International Fight League
 It's Always Sunny in Philadelphia
 The Kill Point
 Kojak
 Line of Fire
 Mad Men
 Magnum, P.I.
 Mandrake
 Married... with Children
 Matrioshki
 Miami Vice
 Mr. Bean
 My Name Is Earl
 Playmakers
 Poker Babies
 The Pretender
 Quasi TG
 S.O.S. Tata
 Sexy Camera all'Italiana
 Sexy Car Wash
 Sexy Girls Next Door
 Skill Factor
 Son of the Beach
 Sons of Anarchy
 Le Star del Pallone
 Stargate SG-1
 T. J. Hooker
 Testees
 Threat Matrix
 Totally Busted
 Underbelly
 Walker, Texas Ranger
 Wanted
 World's Wildest Police Videos
 The X-Files

Programmes FX
FX (Italy)